Daraghazi (also Romanized as Dārāghazī; also known as Ḩeydar Kānlū-ye Soflá) is a village in Minjavan-e Sharqi Rural District, Minjavan District, Khoda Afarin County, East Azerbaijan Province, Iran. At the 2006 census, its population was 68, in 22 families.

Situation
Online edition of the Dehkhoda Dictionary, quoting Iranian Army files, reports a population of 54 people in late 1940s.

References 

Populated places in Khoda Afarin County